Xylechinus is a genus of crenulate bark beetles in the family Curculionidae. There are more than 50 described species in Xylechinus.

Species
These 53 species belong to the genus Xylechinus:

 Xylechinus acaciae Schedl
 Xylechinus aconcaguensis Wood, 2007
 Xylechinus africanus Browne, 1973a
 Xylechinus americanus Blackman, 1922
 Xylechinus araucariae Mecke, 2004
 Xylechinus arisanus Eggers, 1939c
 Xylechinus australis Schedl, 1957d
 Xylechinus avarus Wood, 1969b
 Xylechinus bergeri Spessivtsev & P., 1919
 Xylechinus calvus Schedl
 Xylechinus capensis Wood & Bright, 1992
 Xylechinus chiliensis Wood, 1980c
 Xylechinus darjeelingensis Schedl, 1971c
 Xylechinus declivis Wood, 2007
 Xylechinus formosanus Schedl
 Xylechinus freiburgi Schedl
 Xylechinus fuliginosus Blandford, 1897a
 Xylechinus gummensis Wood, 1986a
 Xylechinus huapiae Wood, 2007
 Xylechinus imperialis Wood & Bright, 1992
 Xylechinus irrasus Blandford, 1897a
 Xylechinus leai Schedl
 Xylechinus maculatus Schedl, 1951d
 Xylechinus marmoratus Blandford, 1897a
 Xylechinus mexicanus Wood, 1974a
 Xylechinus minor Eggers, 1928c
 Xylechinus montanus Blackman, 1940
 Xylechinus mozolevskae Petrov & Perkovsky, 2008
 Xylechinus nahueliae Wood, 2007
 Xylechinus nigrosetosus Hagedorn, 1909a
 Xylechinus obscurus Eggers, 1941b
 Xylechinus ougeniae Wood, 1988a
 Xylechinus padus Wood, 1988a
 Xylechinus papuanus Schedl, 1970a
 Xylechinus pilosus Chapuis, 1869
 Xylechinus planicolle Wood & Bright, 1992
 Xylechinus porteri Brèthes, 1925
 Xylechinus pudus Wood
 Xylechinus roeri Schedl, 1977c
 Xylechinus scabiosus Blandford, 1897a
 Xylechinus solervicensi Wood, 2007
 Xylechinus spathifer Schedl
 Xylechinus squamatilis Wood, 2007
 Xylechinus squamiger Schedl
 Xylechinus squamosus Wood & Bright, 1992
 Xylechinus sulcatus Schedl
 Xylechinus taunayi Eggers, 1928c
 Xylechinus tessellatus Blandford, 1897a
 Xylechinus tuberculifer Wood, 2007
 Xylechinus uniformis Schedl, 1982
 Xylechinus valdivianus Eggers, 1942a
 Xylechinus variegatus Wood & Bright, 1992
 Xylechinus vittatus Schedl

References

Further reading

External links

 

Scolytinae
Articles created by Qbugbot